Sailana State was an 11 gun salute princely state in India, part of the Malwa Agency of Central India during the British Raj. The state enjoyed an estimated revenue of Rs.5,00,000.

History
Sailana State was founded by Raja Jai Singh, great-grandson of Maharaja Ratan Singh, founder of Ratlam State. It is a branch of the Rathore house. In 1716 Jai singh took revenge against his uncle for the murder of his father, he killed him in a pitched battle at sagode and secured Ratlam for his elder brother. The two brothers then divided the state between themselves. Jai Singh's capital was initially at Raoti. He built Sailana as his new capital in 1736. During this period the Maratha influence in central India had been growing and several states had been annexed or forced to pay heavy tributes to the Peshwa. However Jai Singh had the wisdom to form alliances with the Maratha officials, he helped the Peshwa agent Ambaji Pant Trimbak Purandare to collect tribute in Malwa and used the situation to annex the surrounding lands. He fought 22 battles in his lifetime, establishing himself as an independent ruler. Jai Singh maintained an army that was feared by the surrounding states forcing some states to take Holkar's aid against him. The Raja of Sailana favoured Rajputs and Pathans as horsemen while the infantry was drawn from the local populace. His descendant Mokham Singh however replaced this army composition with a surplus of elephants and emptied the state coffers, allowing the Marathas and Pindaris to encroach and loot with impunity. Jai Singh was succeeded by a string of weak rulers. During Raja Mokham Singh's rule much of the territory of Sailana was annexed by Scindia and Holkar, the Raja's of Sailana were further forced to pay tribute to the Scindias of Gwalior. Raja Lakshman Singh of Sailana tried to push the Scindia's out of his kingdom, in 1818 he refused to pay chauth which was regularly levied, the Scindias retaliated by sending an army under Bujang Rao, the Gwalior army which had European arms and was French trained lost its advantage on the hills en route to Sailana and was defeated by Lakshman Singh, the captured soldiers were allowed to leave but all of their guns and artillery were taken. In 1819, Bapu Rao Sindia was appointed to punish the raja of Sailana and enforce tribute upon him. Bapu Rao had previously been sent by the Scindia's to defeat and exact tributes from the Maharaja of Jaipur and the Maharana of Udaipur. On 5 January 1819, John Malcolm mediated between Gwalior and Sailana upon which Raja Lakshman Singh accepted British protection and agreed to pay a fixed tribute to Gwalior until 1860, in return for Daulat Rao Sindhia agreeing to refrain from any interference in Sailana. The tribute treaty did not last for long as Daulat Rao soon relinquished his rights of tribute on Sailana and Ratlam, the tribute was thus paid directly to the British instead. During British rule Sailana saw development under the capable rule of Raja Jashwant Singh II and then under his son Raja Dileep Singh, many reforms were introduced over the coming years, with particular attention being paid to education and the provision of vernacular educational facilities. By 1947, education and medical aid were provided free of charge, the local municipality was placed on a democratic footing and the judiciary and executive made independent of each other. Although the economy was primarily agricultural, some limited industrialisation included oil mills, and iron and steel works. On 15 June 1948, Raja Dileep Singh signed the accession to the Indian Union.

Rulers
The chiefs of Sailana are Rathore Rajputs and have a common ancestry with the Maharajas of Jodhpur and Ratlam.

Rajas

Jagirdars of Sailana State

All the jagirdars owe fealty and service to the ruler and pay cesses and tanka. No jagirdar has the right to adopt without the permission of the raja. The 1st class jagirdars are allowed to wear gold anklets, and at their succession, they are installed by the ruling raja himself. Half of the states lands were alienated because of the large number of Jagirs. Raja Dilip Singh later extinguished several Jagirs and replaced them with governors. This harsh but effective action helped the states revenue which was then used to provide medical and educational facilities in Sailana.

The following were the 1st class Jagirdars of Sailana in 1908.

The following were the 2nd class Jagirdars of Sailana in 1908.

The 3rd class jagirdars were hereditary office holders of the state.

See also
List of Rajput dynasties and states
Malwa Agency

External links
 Royal house of Sailana

References

Princely states of Madhya Pradesh
Ratlam district
Rajputs
Rathores
1736 establishments in India
1948 disestablishments in India